Blue Mountain House Annex, also known as The Log Hotel, is a historic hotel located on the grounds of the Adirondack Museum at Blue Mountain Lake in Hamilton County, New York, USA. It was built in 1876 and is a two-story structure built of square-hewn spruce logs with halved log cornering.  It features a verandah on the south and east. It is one of the earliest and best known of the Adirondack resort hotels.

It was added to the National Register of Historic Places in 1977.

References

External links
National Register of Historic Places

Hotel buildings on the National Register of Historic Places in New York (state)
Houses completed in 1876
Buildings and structures in Hamilton County, New York
National Register of Historic Places in Hamilton County, New York